Levavasseur is a French surname.  It may refer to:

Charles-Jean LeVavasseur (1892-?), pentathlon competitor in the 1924 and 1928 Summer Olympics
Christian Levavasseur (born 1956), cyclist
Katiana Levavasseur (born 1970), French politician
Ingrid Levavasseur, spokesperson for the 2019 Yellow Vest Movement in France
Léon Levavasseur (1863–1922), inventor and aviation engineer
Léon René Levavasseur (1860-1942), artillery officer and creator of the Levavasseur project, an early tank concept
René Levavasseur, architect who designed the Gare Maritime de Cherbourg railway building